Zeybek or Zeibek may refer to:

 Zeybeks, irregular militia and guerrilla fighters from the Aegean Region of Turkey during the War of Independence
 Zeybek dance, a Turkish folk dance from West Anatolia
 Zeibekiko, a Greek folk dance

People with the surname
 Halil Zeybek (born 1985), Turkish footballer 

Turkish-language surnames